Prince Hieronim Mikołaj Radziwiłł (6 January 1885 – 6 April 1945) was a Polish aristocrat, landlord in Balice. Radziwiłł was a great-grandson of Prince Maciej Radziwiłł. He and his children carried the style of Serene Highness.

Early life

Hieronim Mikołaj "Jerome" Radziwiłł was born on 6 January 1885 at Cannes in France. He was a son of Prince Dominik Maria Radziwiłł (1852–1938) and Doña María Dolores de Agramonte y Zayas-Zamudio (1854–1920). Among his siblings were Princess Dolores Radziwiłł, and Princess Isabella Radziwiłł.

His paternal grandparents were Konstanty Radziwiłł and Adela Karnitska (a descendant of Justynian Szczytt). He was a great-grandson of Prince Maciej Radziwiłł. His maternal grandparents were Francisco de Agramonte Cortijo and María de los Dolores de la Torre Dolores de Agramonte, natives of Santiago de Cuba where they were large landowners.

He graduated from the gymnasium in Feldkirch before he began studying law at the Jagiellonian University in 1904. He later moved to the Agricultural College at the university.

Career
In between the World Wars, he was primarily involved in agriculture, breeding and forestry on his Balice estate which had been built by his father. He owned shares in a company producing glass and clay products. Although he was not involved in politics, he was an honorary member of the Supreme Council of the Party of National Monarchists.

During World War II, he was involved in the underground activity of the "Uprawa" gentry organization, which provided funding and food for the Home Army. He was arrested by the Soviet authorities in February 1945 and deported, along with 2,000 prisoners, to a NKVD Gulag labor camp during the Soviet occupation of Poland, where he died shortly after his arrival.

Personal life

On 16 January 1909, Prince Radziwiłł married Archduchess Renata of Austria (1888–1935) in Żywiec. Renata was a daughter of Archduchess Maria Theresa of Austria, Princess of Tuscany and Archduke Charles Stephen of Austria. A first cousin of King Alphonso XIII of Spain, she was a member of the Teschen branch of the House of Habsburg-Lorraine. Upon her marriage to Prince Radziwiłł in 1909, she renounced her titles as Archduchess of Austria and Princess of Bohemia, Hungary, and Tuscany. Before her death on 9 December 1935, they were the parents of six children:

 Princess Maria Teresa Radziwiłł (1910–1973), who died unmarried.
 Prince Dominic Rainer Radziwiłł (1911–1976), who married Princess Eugénie of Greece and Denmark in 1938. They divorced in 1946 and he married Lidia Lacey Bloodgood, a daughter of John Van Schaick Bloodgood and Lida Fleitmann Bloodgood. 
 Prince Karol Jerome Radziwiłł (1912–2005), who married Maria Luisa de Alvear y Quirno in 1949 in Buenos Aires, Argentina, later, Maria Teresa Soto y Alderete.
 Prince Albert Radziwiłł (1914–1932), who died young at Davos, Switzerland.
 Princess Eleonore Radziwiłł (b. 1918), who married Count Benedikt Tyszkiewicz in 1938. She married Roger de Froidcourt in 1959. 
 Prince Leon Jerome Radziwiłł (1922–1973).

After the death of his first wife, the Prince remarried to his cousin, Princess Jadwiga Aniela Radziwiłł in January 1937.

Prince Radziwiłł died at the Gulag, near Luhansk on 6 April 1945. He was buried in a wooden coffin in the steppe near the labor camp.

Descendants
Through his eldest son's first marriage to Princess Eugénie, he was a grandfather of Princess Tatiana Radziwiłł (b. 1939), who married Dr. Jean Henri Fruchaud in 1966, and Prince George Radziwiłł (1942–2001). Through his eldest son's second marriage to Lidia, he was posthumously grandfather of Princess Renata Radziwiłł (1954–2014), who married Swiss banker André Wagnière in 1976, Princess Louise Radziwiłł (b. 1956), who married Sicilian aristocrat Don Antonio Moncada, Nobile dei Principi of Paternò in 1987, and Princess Lyda Radziwiłł (b. 1959), who married Roman aristocrat Prince Innocenzo Odescalchi in 1991.

Through her daughter Eleonore's second marriage, he was posthumously a grandfather of Remy de Froidcourt (b. 1960).

References
Notes

Sources

1885 births
1945 deaths
Hieronimin Mikolaj
Polish people who died in Soviet detention
Polish deportees to Soviet Union
Polish people detained by the NKVD
Foreign Gulag detainees
People who died in the Gulag
Polish landlords
20th-century Polish landowners